The Post Office Historic District is a historic district in Greenville, Alabama at 100–115 West Commerce and 101 East Commerce Streets.  It was listed on the National Register of Historic Places in 1986 and includes Early Commercial architecture, Classical Revival architecture, and Art Deco architecture in its nine contributing buildings.

Gallery

See also 
List of United States post offices

References 

Historic districts in Butler County, Alabama
Post office buildings on the National Register of Historic Places in Alabama
National Register of Historic Places in Butler County, Alabama
Historic districts on the National Register of Historic Places in Alabama
Greenville, Alabama